The "Austin Senators" is the name of various minor league baseball teams based in Austin, Texas, United States which played on-and-off between 1898 and 1964. Different incarnations of the Senators have played in the Texas League (1888–1890, 1905, 1907–1908, 1911–1914, 1956–1967), Texas-Southern League (1896), South Texas League (1906) Middle Texas League (1915) and Texas Association (1925–1926).

History
In 1915, the Senators moved to the Middle Texas League and won two games as the Austin Representatives before relocating to Taylor, Texas due to severe flooding. They were known as the Austin Rangers playing in the Texas Association from 1925–1926). From 1956–1967 they were affiliated with the Milwaukee/Atlanta Braves. For the final three seasons of their existence, they were known as the "Austin Braves." After the 1967 season, the team relocated to Shreveport, Louisiana, depriving Austin of professional baseball for the rest of the 20th century.

Over the course of their existence, they won multiple league championships. Their first came in 1906 under manager Warren Gill. They won their next in 1907 under Brooks Gordon; during the same year, the Senators would post one of the most lopsided victories in baseball history, by defeating the San Antonio Bronchos in the second game of a doubleheader 44–0. During this game, Senators player Harry Short scored seven runs on five hits, stole four bases and hit a double and a triple.

In 1911, the Senators won their third championship under manager Dale Gear. They won their final league championship in 1959 under the guidance of Ernie White. In that season, Charlie Gorin threw a no-hitter against the Mexico City Diablos Rojos. On the 50th anniversary of their championship season, members of the 1959 team reunited in Central Texas where they were honored during a Round Rock Express series and given championship rings.

Timeline

See also
 Riverside Park (Austin)

References

Baseball teams established in 1898
Baseball teams in Austin, Texas
Defunct minor league baseball teams
1898 establishments in Texas
Defunct baseball teams in Texas
Baseball teams disestablished in 1964
Texas-Southern League teams